Phrynichus, son of Polyphradmon and pupil of Thespis, was one of the earliest of the Greek tragedians. Some ancients regarded him as the real founder of tragedy. Phrynichus is said to have died in Sicily.  His son Polyphrasmon was also a playwright.

Phyrynichus wrote two out of the three known Greek tragedies that dealt with contemporary history from episodes from the Persian Wars (no longer extant).

Works

He gained his first victory in a drama contest in 511 BC. His famous play, the Capture of Miletus or the Sack of Miletus, was probably composed shortly after the conquest of that city by the Persians during the Ionian Revolt. Miletus was a colony of Athens and therefore traditionally held especially dear to the mother city.  The audience was moved to tears by Phrynichus' tragedy, with the poet being fined "", "for reminding familiar misfortunes". As a result, the play was banned from being performed again. (Herodotus 6.21.10)

In 476 BC, Phrynichus was successful with the Phoenissae, called after the Phoenician women who formed the chorus.  This drama celebrated the defeat of Xerxes I at the Battle of Salamis four years earlier. Themistocles provided the funds as choregos (producer), and one of the objectives of the play was to remind the Athenians of his great deeds. The Persians of Aeschylus (472 BC) was modeled after the Phoenissae. 

The titles of his other known plays (Actaeon, Alcestis, Antaeus, Daughters of Danaus, Egyptians, Pleuroniai, and Tantalus) show that he dealt with mythological as well as contemporary subjects. He introduced a separate actor, as distinct from the leader of the chorus, and thus laid the foundation for theatrical dialogue. But in his plays, as in the early tragedies generally, the dramatic element was subordinate to the lyric element as represented by the chorus and the dance. According to the Suda, Phrynichus first introduced female characters on the stage (played by men in masks), and made special use of the trochaic tetrameter.

Recognition
Aelian (Claudius Aelianus), in his Varia Historia (3.8), says that Phrynichus' martial verses so stirred the people of Athens, they made him a general.

Fragments of his work exist in Johann August Nauck's Tragicorum graecorum fragmenta (1887), pp 720–725.

See also
Theatre of ancient Greece

Notes
  Buckham, p. 108: "The honour of introducing Tragedy in its later acceptation was reserved for a scholar of Thespis in 511 BC, Polyphradmon's son, Phrynichus; he dropped the light and ludicrous cast of the original drama and dismissing Bacchus and the Satyrs formed his plays from the more grave and elevated events recorded in mythology and history of his country."
  Plato, Minos 321a: "Now tragedy is a thing of ancient standing here; it did not begin, as people suppose, from Thespis or from Phrynicus, but if you will reflect, you will find it is a very ancient invention of our city."
  Suda φ 762

References
 
 
 
The Oxford Classical Dictionary, p. 1177.

External links
Tragicorum graecorum fragmenta 

6th-century BC Athenians
5th-century BC Athenians
6th-century BC poets
5th-century BC poets
6th-century BC births
5th-century BC deaths
Ancient Greek dramatists and playwrights
Tragic poets
Ionian Revolt